Yuri Sokolovsky (born 11 April 1995) is a Ukrainian footballer who plays as a defender.

Career 
Sokolovsky began his career in 2012 with FC Ternopil in the Ukrainian Second League. In 2014, he played in the Ukrainian First League after FC Ternopil secured a promotion in 2014. In 2017, he played abroad in the Canadian Soccer League with FC Vorkuta. In his debut season he assisted FC Ukraine in achieving a perfect season, and claimed the CSL Second Division Championship. While in his sophomore year he assisted in securing the First Division title.

References 

1995 births
Living people
Ukrainian footballers
FC Ternopil players
FC Ukraine United players
Canadian Soccer League (1998–present) players
Association football defenders
Ukrainian Second League players
Ukrainian First League players
Sportspeople from Ternopil Oblast